Laird James McCullen Destro XXIV, usually referred to simply as Destro, is a fictional character from the G.I. Joe: A Real American Hero toyline, comic books, and cartoon series. He is the leader of the Iron Grenadiers, and founder of M.A.R.S. Industries, a weapons manufacturer and supplier for Cobra. Destro is portrayed by Christopher Eccleston in the 2009 live-action film G.I. Joe: The Rise of Cobra.

Profile
Born in Callander, Scotland, Destro's full name is James McCullen Destro XXIV, and he is Laird of the Castle Destro in the Scottish Highlands. The Destro clan has designed and sold weapons for centuries, and Destro is the faceless power behind their current incarnation—M.A.R.S. (Military Armament Research Syndicate), a state-of-the-art weapons manufacturer and one of the largest multinational corporations in the world. As a businessman, Destro is cutthroat and unyielding and is able to maintain apartments or office buildings in most major cities of the world. His luxurious lifestyle outdoes most oil sheiks or shipping magnates. Destro was an early investor in Macau and has other potentially lucrative speculative real estate holdings in developing areas of the world. War is his business and passion; Destro believes in the spoils of war and the vast wealth M.A.R.S. provides. He hires mercenaries to stir up conflict in dangerous regions, then provides high-tech arms to any side able to meet his price. Continuing a tradition started by the first Destro, he will even sell to both sides of the same war.

Destro's key characteristics are his sense of honor, a calm demeanor, and love for Cobra's second-in-command, the Baroness. He wears a mask forged from beryllium steel, a tradition dating back to the Wars of the Three Kingdoms, when an ancestor of his was caught by Cromwell's men in the act of selling weapons to both sides. Forced to wear a steel mask for his crimes (neither side wanted to execute the ancestor because they still wanted the weapons he sold), the Destro clan has since turned it into a symbol of pride, passing it down from father to son for over 20 generations. He also wears on a neck chain his family crest bearing an ancient Scottish emblem symbolizing absolute power. Destro will sometimes enter battle himself, either as a member of Cobra Command, or against them if it is better for business. He respects the G.I. Joe Team for their combat skills, but detests them for wasting their skills to maintain peace. Destro and Cobra Commander despise each other, but maintain an alliance of convenience. Although twice the tactician and three times the soldier of Cobra Commander, Destro's sense of honor works to his disadvantage in the face of Cobra Commander's ruthlessness.

Toys

A Real American Hero toy line
Destro was first released as an action figure in 1983, as a part of the second series of 3" G.I. Joe: A Real American Hero figures. This initial version featured a silver, vacuum-metalized head. In 1988, a second version was produced, this time with a gold vac-metalized head. This figure was released as part of the Iron Grenadiers faction, and the new mask symbolized his change in allegiance. A third figure of Destro followed in 1992, once again featuring his silver mask, this time painted instead of chromed. In 1993, a Star Brigade version of Destro was included in the Armor-Tech wave (again with a vac-metalized head). The same year, Hasbro revisited the long-dormant 12" G.I. Joe action figure scale, featuring the characters from "A Real American Hero". Destro was included in the 1993 series, packaged with a removable helmet that revealed his face underneath.

Hasbro and Toys "R" Us created a 15th Anniversary line in 1997, where Destro was released as part of the Cobra Command 3-pack. The pack was intended to feature the original 1983 mold of Destro but it had been lost by this time, forcing Hasbro to use the bulkier 1992 figure instead, in a variety of different color combinations. The same figure was repainted once more (in a more traditional color scheme) in 2001, when Hasbro expanded the line to the mass market.

In 2002, Hasbro relaunched the G.I. Joe “A Real American Hero” toyline for its 20th anniversary, and a new Destro figure was included in the initial wave. This Destro has a radically different uniform, and his face is molded with an open mouth and bared teeth.

Spy Troops
For 2003's Spy Troops, another new Destro was created, this time featuring him in a casual sweater and trousers, with the chromed steel mask returning. A 12" version of Destro was also released for the Spy Troops sub-line. Another Destro was released in 2004, in the "Valor vs Venom" sub-line, which returned Destro to his classic military look, but with a different color scheme. Repainting of the 1992 Destro has continued in the comic book 3-packs released in 2004–06, with a new head mold based on his comic appearance in Marvel #24.

Sigma 6
Destro is also included in the 8" Sigma 6 toyline. The figure is clad in Cobra blue, with a red collar reminiscent of the 1983 toy, and a vac-metalized head mold. A repainted "Crime Boss" version of this figure was released shortly before the line's demise in 2007.

25th Anniversary
Hasbro created two boxed sets of figures, featuring modern sculpting and increased articulation (including the replacement of G.I. Joe's trademark O-Ring construction). Destro was included in the inaugural Cobra set, along with Cobra Commander, Baroness, Storm Shadow, and a Cobra Trooper. This figure was later re-released individually. For the 2007 San Diego Comic Con, Hasbro repainted Destro in the color scheme of the ultra-rare 1997 "Pimp Daddy" Destro figure. Two versions of this figure were made: one had the traditional silver mask head while the other had the Iron Grenadier-themed gold mask. As part of the Comic Pack line, the figure was released again, this time with a blueish silver/dark blue color scheme that resembles Destro's first appearance in the Marvel series, as well as a vac-metal head. He came packaged with the G.I. Joe soldier Breaker and a copy of G.I. Joe #14.

In 2008, a new version of the Iron Grenadier Destro was released. Using a new mold, it was released as a single-card figure. A blueish-tinted variant, representing the coloration of the original Marvel comic version, was released in a comic-book set with an Iron Grenadier figure and an original comic book. There was also a variant with this figure, which was a black head for Destro.

G.I. Joe Classified Series
2020 saw the release of the G.I. Joe Classified Series, a new line of highly articulated 6-inch scale action figures that includes prominent characters like Destro. This line features premium deco, detailing, articulation, and classic design updated to bring the classic characters into the modern era, plus accessories inspired by each character's rich history.

Comic series

Marvel Comics (1982-1994)
In the comic continuity, Destro fancies himself an honorable man, answering to a moral code he alone seems to understand. He has stood with the Commander as often as he has opposed him, and will join forces with the G.I. Joe team if it is good for business. With such wavering loyalties, he has come to respect and befriend many characters, from Joe members Flint and Lady Jaye, to Baroness, and even the Commander's estranged son Billy. However, his strongest connection is to the Baroness, and it is revealed early on that she has shared a romantic relationship with him since before the comic begins.

Destro first appears in the Marvel Comics series G.I. Joe: A Real American Hero #11, although his face is not seen. He is Cobra Commander's hired "specialist", sent to stop the G.I. Joe team from ruining their operation on the Alaskan Pipeline. Although Destro manages to stay two steps ahead of the Joes, his confrontation with Doc results in the Joes getting the antidote for a plague with which they had been infected, and turning the tables on Cobra. His first full appearance reveals his name and establishes his true intentions: he plans to remove the Commander from the equation, and lead Cobra himself, with the Baroness at his side. The Commander comes to suspect this betrayal, and recruits Major Bludd to kill Destro.

A night operation in Washington, D.C. gives Bludd his chance. But when the Baroness (who was driving Bludd's HISS tank) realizes what he is planning, she swerves sharply, overturning the tank and setting it on fire. The tank explodes, seemingly killing her, and leaves Destro a shattered wreck of his former self. The Commander uses this turn of events to point Destro's rage toward Bludd, and operates for a while without the fear of Destro's treachery. But when the Commander is captured by G.I. Joe, Destro wastes no time taking control. At this point the Baroness returns, and reveals the Commander's part in her near death.

After a battle in the Everglades, Destro, Wild Weasel, and Firefly are stranded, with only their wiles to get them past the G.I. Joe team, and back to Cobra's home town of Springfield. This brings him into repeated conflict with the Joes, including a fist fight with Cutter. When they finally arrive in Springfield, however, Baroness reveals that she and Bludd have recruited a young boy to assassinate the Commander during a Cobra rally. During the ceremony, Destro spots the trained killer, and realizes it is Cobra Commander's own son, Billy. Saving the man he swore to kill, Destro reveals a new side of himself: that of an honorable man who cannot condone patricide, even against a hated foe.

Destro heads the tribunal that questions Billy, and later tries to stop Storm Shadow from helping the boy escape. After the creation of Cobra Island, Destro and the Baroness meet with the curious Doctor Mindbender, as he demonstrates a bio-weapon to them (quick growing vines that spew knock out gas). Although the vines are defeated by Lady Jaye and a team of G.I. Joe trainees, they bring Doctor Mindbender to Cobra, where his true plans are put into effect. With the Commander's consent and Destro's help, Doctor Mindbender collects the bodies of history's ten greatest warriors, which are used to create Serpentor. Serpentor is quickly recruited to fight a holding action against G.I. Joe, while Destro coordinates a complete evacuation of Springfield. Once the citizens of the small town are safe, Destro again shows his honorable side, and rescues Serpentor and the defenders.

Assaulting the Pit under Ft. Wadsworth, Staten Island, the Commander becomes indignant at Serpentor and his successful campaign to take Cobra as his own. Cobra Commander leads a team of troops into the subterranean base, and Destro chooses to join him. The two are trapped underneath tons of rubble, when the defenders detonate The Pit's lowest levels, and cave in the entire installation. While the Commander becomes unhinged, Destro reasons his way through, and uncovers an earth-boring machine that saves their lives. Traveling across country in disguise, they are reunited with Billy, who is in a coma after his car was blown up by the Cobra agent Scrap-Iron (by orders of Firefly). Watching the Commander grieve for his misdeeds, Destro decides his time with Cobra has ended, and leaves. He returns to Scotland to reclaim his family's legacy, but on arrival, he is greeted by a doppelganger and thrown in prison. With the intervention of Lady Jaye and Flint, Destro overthrows the fake, who turns out to be Major Bludd.

Some time later, Destro resurfaces as the leader of his own organization, the Iron Grenadiers. After inciting a war in Sierra Gordo, he takes part in the Cobra Island Civil War. He invades the island with his Grenadiers and confronts Serpentor's forces, but only requests that the Baroness (whom Serpentor had captured) be turned over to him. With the Baroness in his custody, he withdraws from the island. Displaying his honor yet again, Destro helps blackmail a pair of politicians who are trying to blame G.I. Joe for aiding Serpentor in the Civil War.

Content to stay out of the ongoing war between G.I. Joe and Cobra, Destro is nonetheless made a target by Cobra Commander II, and Castle Destro is assaulted by Cobra. Turning the tables, Destro overpowers the fake Commander, and effectively takes over Cobra. While he unveils an intricate plan of checks and balances to keep the Cobra High Command and his Iron Grenadiers on even footing, the Baroness discovers that Snake Eyes was the soldier she believed shot her brother in Southeast Asia. Waging an ill-advised personal vendetta, she ensnares Snake Eyes and Storm Shadow in the NYC Cobra Consulate Building which is laid waste in the ensuing battle. As the roof collapses, and the three are about the plummet to their death, Destro arrives in a helicopter. He reveals that not only was he in Southeast Asia that day with his father, but that Snake Eyes was innocent of killing her brother Eugene. Taking his lover away, he removes his mask for her, and the two retire for a time, while the Baroness puts her life back together.

As soon as Destro abandons Cobra, the original Commander returns, and locks most of his old lackeys in a freighter, and buries it under the volcano on Cobra Island. Among the victims are Zartan and Billy, although they have the distinction of being two of the three (Firefly being the last) who manage to dig themselves out. Because of his honorable character, they look to Destro for refuge. At the same time, the Commander (still seeking revenge on his old associates) assaults and destroys Castle Destro. Because of his spy in Cobra, Metal-Head, Destro manages to escape from the Castle, aided by G.I. Joe agent Chuckles, and the Commander puts a bounty on Destro's head.

Now a marked man, Destro teams up with Billy and Zartan to rescue the Baroness, who is captured by Cobra in the raid. Teaming up with the G.I. Joe Ninja Force, the former Cobras break into the Night Creepers' citadel, and begin wiping out Cobra bank accounts. To save his fortunes, the Commander agrees to call off the bounty on Destro, return the Baroness to him, and provide him with a new castle.

That turns out to be the Silent Castle in Trans-Carpathia, where Slice and Dice have assembled the remaining Red Ninjas. With G.I. Joe guarding the Castle and Cobra arriving to activate the subliminal suggestions the Commander implanted in the Baroness while she was his prisoner, a four-way war breaks out, in the middle of which, Destro reveals the secret duality of the Castle. Keeping his promise to the Baroness that he would love her so long as Castle Destro stands, he transforms the castle into a duplicate of his Scottish home, and the Baroness's love for him breaks the Commander's hold. Routing Cobra and the ninjas, the couple are left alone once more.

After a time, the Commander decides that he wants to move on from Cobra Island and reclaim the Castle from Destro. On the run from a Cobra invasion, Destro and Baroness contact G.I. Joe for an extraction. Snake Eyes and Storm Shadow come to their rescue, but not before Destro sets the transformation controls to create a nightmare of architecture, and confronts Scarlett (posing as a traitor). On the rooftop, Snake Eyes is forced to run her through with his sword (narrowly missing her heart) to keep her cover, and make good their escape. Destro tries to give his thanks for the rescue, but is silently rebuffed by Snake Eyes, who resents having been put in such a position.

Afterwards, General Hawk takes Destro and Baroness to Cobra Island, where they are reunited with Zartan, who warns them all of the inevitable return of Dr. Mindbender. With the Commander fighting G.I. Joe in Millville, Destro, Baroness, and Zartan retake the Trans-Carpathian castle. They are soon joined by Billy, and the small group is reunited for a while. Soon after Dr. Mindbender is revived, he reveals that he placed a brain implant into Destro's mind during the removal of a wisdom tooth. Zartan also has one, and Cobra Commander's unmasked face is the trigger that activates them. Cobra ventures once more to the Castle, and the Commander removes his hood, turning Destro and Zartan to his side.

With Destro's superior tactical mind, Cobra begins a campaign that leaves them in control of Trans-Carpathia, Darklonia, and Borigia-Krazny/Marango. It is when they assault Wolkekukuckland that they come up against the G.I. Joe team, and the progress is halted. During the stalemate, Snake Eyes attacks the Silent Castle to rescue Storm Shadow, only to find that he, along with the Baroness and Billy, have been brainwashed to serve Cobra as well. On the run, the Joes escape Cobra, and return to the United States, only to be deactivated by the government. The series comes to a close, leaving Destro and the others under the thrall of Cobra Commander.

Devil's Due (2001-2008)
In “The Mission That Never Was”, it is revealed that the core G.I. Joe members were sent on one final mission, which resulted in Cobra's Brainwave Scanner being corrupted by a virus that spread through the entirety of their mainframe. Crippled and defeated, Cobra then fell to a "unified military attack" (this attack is never detailed in a story, but hinted at in various “Battle Files” entries). A happy side effect of this confluence of events was the incapacitation of the Brainwave Scanner. Without repeated "self-medication" via the Scanner, the Baroness was freed from her artificial loyalty to Cobra. It is left ambiguous as to how Destro overcame his brain implant (which was self-contained, and thus unaffected by the virus), but it is speculated that, as happened in the Silent Castle some time earlier, the love between James and Ana can overcome any obstacle. The two returned to Trans-Carpathia and retired from the intrigue and danger of Cobra, but continued to rebuild M.A.R.S. Industries, establishing an outpost in Scotland. During this time, Dr. Mindbender and Scrap-Iron both enjoyed productive employment with M.A.R.S. But at some point, James contracted a serious family illness, and was bed-ridden for a long time.

It is at this point that his illegitimate son, Alexander, surfaced. Vulnerable in his weakened state, James took Alexander in and gave him full run of the operation. Wanting to make his father proud, he usurped the Destro identity and recruited Lilian Osbourne (Mistress Armada) to lead his armies, as he had nowhere near the tactical genius of his father. When James begins to recover from the illness, Destro injects him with an experimental nanite technology, which keeps him incapacitated. Destro then arranges for the Cobra Commander to learn of the nanites' existence. Thinking he's stealing them from a U.S. government, the Commander devises an elaborate scheme to take control of the country. With new-found momentum, Cobra Commander begins contacting all his old allies, and returns to the U.S.

Destro and the Baroness attend the meeting in Zartan's Florida compound, appearing to all as couple on the outs. After hearing him out, Destro and Lilian stage a coup, and take the Commander prisoner. Using the nanites on the Commander and all the former Cobra agents (save Zartan), Destro is able to secure his hold over the organization, and effect the reunification the Commander had hoped for. Manipulating all the members of Cobra, Destro unleashes the nanites on the United States, very nearly taking over. It is only because of the intervention of the G.I. Joe team (who were reinstated when the Commander returned to U.S. soil), and Cobra Commander (who was freed from the prison by Storm Shadow, and cured of the nanites) that Destro fails in his bid for domination. When the nanites are defeated, the real Destro is freed from his paralyzed state just in time to greet Alex and Lilian, who are imprisoned after the Baroness rescues them from their losing battle.

Back in control, Destro is forced to make restitution to Cobra for his son's transgressions. Offering the Commander an explanation for the doppelganger as well as the hi-tech Destro family helmet that aided Alex in his deception, Destro agrees to work with Cobra until such time that he feels the debt is paid. Soon after this, the Baroness is kidnapped by the Yakuza, and Destro teams up with G.I. Joe (Flint has also gone missing) to rescue her. In the fight, Alex proves his newfound loyalty to his father, and follows orders exactly.

The Commander is captured by Serpentor, now in charge of the Coil. When he and a group of Joes affect an escape, he contacts Destro, stating "assist me, and all debts are clear". Rallying all of Cobra with him, Destro assaults Cobra Island and helps defeat the Coil. After the battle, the Commander has disappeared, and Destro is left, seemingly against his desires, in charge of Cobra. So when the Commander finally surfaces with Storm Shadow in tow, Destro takes the opportunity to leave Cobra, for good and all. In a shocking twist, however, the Baroness does not join him.

Heading up his own operations in an attempt to finally put M.A.R.S. back on solid ground, Destro strikes a deal with Guillermo Gomes in Sierra Muerto, to double cross Sierra Gordo's President. Sending in Iron Grenadiers disguised as Sierra Muerto mercenaries, Destro then approaches President Delacruz for permission to build weapon factories within Sierra Gordo borders in exchange for routing the invaders. Intending for the President to be assassinated, and Gomes to take control of both countries, Destro would then be positioned as the region's biggest gun runner. This elaborate scheme was derailed by Duke, who had helped foster peace between the warring countries before Destro began his machinations, and arrested the arms dealer.

Put on trial by the U.N., Destro turns the tables on everyone, and offers not only full disclosure of a number of dirty dealings concerning key U.N. countries, but also the guaranteed capture of Cobra Commander to assure his release. Taking his offer, the Joes are charged with transporting Destro by train, to lure Cobra into a trap. When both Cobra Commander and Baroness arrive to free Destro, the Commander and Hawk throw down. Defeating his foe, the Commander shoots Hawk in the back, only to be shot himself, by the Baroness.

The ruse is successful, and the Commander is in U.S. custody, leaving Destro and a pregnant Baroness in control of Cobra. During this shift in power, Alex and Lilian are charged with recruiting Charles Halifax, also known as Wraith, to free Major Bludd and Scrap-Iron from Blackwater prison. Cobra begins to solidify under Destro's leadership, as the search for a mysterious Tempest device drives their new campaign. But even this very dedicated attempt by Destro to take hold of Cobra is short lived, when it is revealed that Zartan, not the Commander, was captured by G.I. Joe. Freeing Zartan, the Commander emerges from hiding, and overthrows Destro one last time.

During the coup, the Baroness and Wraith (charged with her personal safety) are seemingly killed when the Commander detonates the Night Raven they are aboard. As happened many years before when the Baroness' HISS tank exploded, Destro is incapacitated by his grief, and sits rotting in a Cobra prison as the Commander takes over a much more efficient Cobra.

America's Elite
Escaping from Cobra when the Red Shadows attempted a worldwide take-over, Destro resurfaces (literally) a year later a much different man. Now operating from a submarine, Destro has become embittered and distant from both his son Alex, and Wraith, who somehow avoided boarding the Night Raven before its explosion. He aids Vance Wingfield in attacking the United States with shielded satellites as he brokers a deal with China. When Scarlett is overtaken by BATs while attempting to contact former Cobra agent Cesspool, Destro is revealed to be pulling the strings. Torturing Scarlett for information, Destro is undermined by Alex, who attempts to rid them of the dangerous G.I. Joe prisoner. When the Joes eventually catch up to him, Destro sets the sub to self-destruct, and escapes with Alex. Snake Eyes is trapped in a flooded corridor, though he is later revived with "ninja magic".

After his rehabilitation, Destro gives Alexander a new mask, formally naming him heir to the Destro legacy. However, when the Baroness escapes from G.I. Joe custody, Destro is lured into a trap by the Cobra Commander. In exchange for his infant son, Eugen, Destro not only turns over the M.A.R.S. Empire, but Alexander as well, to Cobra Commander. Destro's actions give Cobra Commander the power to incite World War III, using Alexander to lay siege to London with cloaking technology that M.A.R.S. developed from Wraith's Armor. To combat M.A.R.S. technology, Storm Shadow is sent by the G.I. Joe team to find Destro and the Baroness. Storm Shadow strikes a deal with Destro to aid the Joes, with the proviso that when Cobra is defeated Destro will turn himself over to the authorities. Destro and Sparks succeed in disarming the Cobra-controlled satellites. Destro then flies to Europe with the Baroness to stop Alexander and his Iron Grenadier, supported by the Baroness' secret army: Athena. Upon recognizing Destro, the Iron Grenadier cease combat. Destro manifests his disapproval to Alexander who takes off the family mask and walks away from his raging father. Armada fatally shoots Alexander, thinking that's what Destro wanted. Destro walks away carrying his deceased son, while the Baroness shoots and kills Armada. It is later revealed that Destro was true to his word and turned himself in to the authorities, while Baroness has evaded capture. In one of the series' final scenes, Baroness is seen watching his trial on TV with their child Eugen.

Action Force continuities

IPC
In the mid-1980s, IPC's Battle Action Force weekly comic (in conjunction with Palitoy) began to conform their storylines to more closely resemble the Hasbro toyline. Destro was introduced as the second incarnation of the Red Shadows character, Red Jackal, driver of the Hyena tracked vehicle.

After the Red Shadows were betrayed by Baron Ironblood, Red Jackal sought revenge against his former leader, who had become the Cobra Commander. The Commander sprayed acid into Jackal's face, but chose to spare his life and renamed him Destro. (For more detail see Red Jackal's transition to Destro.)

As in other continuities, the loyalties of this version of Destro were suspect. In School for Snakes, he confronted his former colleague the Black Major, who had also survived Ironblood's treachery and sworn revenge. They conspired to kill Cobra Commander, after which Destro would take over the organization, supplying the Major with the means to disappear into obscurity. But when a group of Cobra loyalists led by the Baroness fought back, Destro decided that he could not risk being exposed, turning against and seemingly killing the Black Major—who survived.

Marvel UK
After IPC turned the Action Force license over to Marvel UK, Destro's character falls in line with the U.S. depiction. Destro features heavily in the magazine's original content, as the most prolific of Cobra's members and personal antagonist to Flint and Lady Jaye. Because of Marvel UK's serial nature, Destro is not as complex as his American counterpart, being portrayed as an actual villain, willingly fighting Action Force and arming Cobra. He is highly manipulative, not just using Action Force in his schemes but also trying to manipulate Cobra Commander; he believes Cobra can win in the long term, but that the Commander is too excessive and, if not subtly controlled, will go too far and cause the Great Powers of the world to wipe Cobra out.

Alternate continuities

G.I. Joe vs. Transformers (Devil's Due)
Destro features prominently in this series of four crossover miniseries which pose the question: What if Cobra discovered the Ark, and rebuilt the Autobots and Decepticons as weapons of war? Destro helped provide Cobra with the technology to rebuild and control the Cybertronians, and even pilots Soundwave on a mission.

Transformers vs. G.I. Joe (Dreamwave)
Set during World War II, Destro is part of a Nazi-esque Cobra who have subjugated the Decepticons and taken over Europe.

Reloaded
A modern revamp of the "Real American Hero" franchise, Destro is recruited by Cobra Commander in the initial book Cobra Reborn. He was later part of the Cobra plot to steal the Constitution where he fights the G.I. Joe agent Roadblock.

Sigma 6
Devil's Due created a mini-series based on Sigma 6. It follows the style and the content of the animated series, spotlighting a different member of Sigma 6 and Cobra in each issue. Destro appears in the first issue, battling Duke in Guam.

Animation

Sunbow
In the 1980s G.I. Joe animated series, Destro was voiced by Arthur Burghardt. In the Sunbow produced series, Destro is portrayed much differently, as he and Cobra Commander have a more contemptuous relationship. Destro is not afraid to say what is on his mind and even physically assaults him in some cases. Cobra Commander usually just lets him get away with it because he is the only one who would know how to operate the doomsday devices he makes. Destro is the creator of such technological super weapons as the Weather Dominator. He has also created some organic implements of destruction such as the Creeper Vine, as seen in The Revenge of Cobra miniseries. Furthermore, while Cobra Commander was generally portrayed as a bungler, Destro was both a more serious and more competent villain.

The origin of Destro's mask is given in the first-season episode "Skeletons in the Closet". In this episode, it is revealed that an ancestor of Destro's was convicted of witchcraft and forced to wear a hideous metal mask that marked the nature of his crime. As a mark of defiance, all of this man's descendants chose to wear masks, Destro included, and meet at a family manor in Scotland every winter solstice to honor their vow. This episode also reveals that Destro shares a common ancestor with G.I. Joe member Lady Jaye, who stumbles upon their meeting, leading to a battle between G.I. Joe and Cobra which destroys his ancestral home. This was orchestrated by the Baroness as vengeance for Destro's earlier infidelity.

In season two, having grown tired of Cobra Commander's failures, Destro joins Doctor Mindbender and Tomax and Xamot in an attempt to create a new leader. They eventually succeed when they create Serpentor. It appears as though Destro realizes Serpentor is growing too powerful and that under Cobra Commander's leadership he had more power within Cobra, and in the final episode of the second season he is helping Cobra Commander and the Coil, an organization built by the Commander to eliminate Serpentor, Doctor Mindbender and G.I. Joe in one sweep.

G.I. Joe: The Movie
Destro has a supporting role in G.I. Joe: The Movie, offering his loyalty to Serpentor, Golobulus and Cobra-La, quickly turning against Cobra Commander once again. In the final battle between the Joes and Cobra-La, Destro is seen fighting, but it is not revealed how he escaped from the explosion that destroyed the rest of Cobra-La.

DiC
In the miniseries "Operation: Dragonfire" of the DiC G.I. Joe, Destro (voiced by Maurice LaMarche) has survived the events of the movie and is now Serpentor's right-hand man. He now sports a gold mask and 'Iron Grenadier' uniform with cape. Apparently having tired of the Baroness, Destro is now in a relationship with Zarana. Humiliated by Destro's rejection, The Baroness uses Dragonfire energy to return Cobra Commander to semi-human form. Once he has returned, Cobra Commander contacts Destro, who informs the Commander he will join him again if he is able to overthrow Serpentor. He is also forced to "dump" Zarana by the Baroness, which he does, literally, through a trap door. With Serpentor defeated, Destro renews his alliance with Cobra Commander and repairs his relationship with the Baroness.

Throughout the series, Destro does not show as much disrespect for the Commander as he did in the Sunbow series, appearing more loyal than before. But he does still maintain his role as the more level-headed and intelligent of the Cobra leaders, and often has to talk some sense into Cobra Commander and stop his hysterical rants. He still shows his disdain for the Commander, but mainly keeps his remarks to himself. In the second season of the DIC series, Destro regains his silver mask and dons a variation of his classic outfit.

Spy Troops and Valor vs. Venom
Destro appeared in the direct-to-video CGI animated movies G.I. Joe: Spy Troops and G.I. Joe: Valor vs. Venom, voiced by Scott McNeil.

Sigma 6
In G.I. Joe: Sigma 6, Marc Thompson voices Destro. In the Sigma 6 continuity, he is loyal to Cobra Commander and still serves as Cobra's weapons designer. Destro is put in custody at the series end. This version of Destro may be a cyborg or at least possess some bionic enhancements, having stated he possessed "circuits in his body".

Resolute
In the miniseries, Destro and the Baroness are part of a subplot in which they have taken a team of scientists hostage. Roadblock, Beach Head, Gung-Ho and Stalker have to rescue them before Destro starts killing them. Unlike other animated versions of Destro, this one has a noticeable Scottish accent. He was voiced by Eric Bauza.

Renegades
Destro appears in G.I. Joe: Renegades voiced by Clancy Brown with an amalgamated Scottish/Irish accent. Known as James McCullen XXIV, he was the CEO of the legitimate M.A.R.S. Industries until it became allied to Cobra Industries. He is shown to be on friendly terms with the Baroness, though the extent of their relationship remains unclear. In the episode "Rage", McCullen was in collaboration with Scrap-Iron in capturing war veterans from the street in order to find the right brainwaves that would help in the mass-production of some exo-armors for Cobra Industries. Tunnel Rat ended up being one of the victims. Later, Roadblock was a victim and McCullen found a match in his brainwaves. When G.I. Joe arrived and disabled the controls on the exo-armor, Roadblock lunged towards McCullen and Scrap-Iron as they get into their helicopter. McCullen declares the test complete now that they have the data and fires a missile at G.I. Joe. Though Roadblock managed to deflect the missile back at the helicopter injuring part of Scrap-Iron's head. McCullen tells Scrap-Iron that his injuries will be avenged as he sets the exo-suit to self-destruct. The G.I. Joes managed to get away before it explodes while McCullen and Scrap-Iron escape.

In the episode "The Enemy of My Enemy", Cobra Commander (in his Adam DeCobray alias) has McCullen collaborate with Doctor Mindbender in order to have the Bio-Viper combine with the Exo-Armor. McCullen wasn't pleased with working with Doctor Mindbender and even disguised himself in order to leak info of this to G.I. Joe. McCullen even shows Adam DeCobray and Baroness the Achilles heel of the Bio-Vipers when he unleashes the Iron Grenadier exo-armors. When McCullen mentions about the exo-armors stating that he will give them 10,000 exo-armors as a pre-order, he states that he will require payment for them. However, Mindbender reveals McCullen's leaking info to the Joes while revealing his own Mecha-Vipers. Following that, Cobra Commander reveals himself while setting Serpentor on McCullen. Following that, having M.A.R.S. Industries absorbed into Cobra Industries, Cobra Commander places a mask on McCullen to force him to serve him while christening him Destro (which is his family's name for those who embarrass or shame the family). Here his mask is unlike previous version, more robotic as opposed to the appearance of a bald man with metal skin shown in other incarnations.

In "Castle Destro", the Joes end up in Destro's castle where the Bio-Dag weapon is developed by Destro and Doctor Mindbender. Destro requests to Cobra Commander that Baroness arrives in Scotland to oversee the project. Destro also tells Baroness that the Joes ended up in his castle. When Baroness arrived, Destro has a royal repast with Baroness before they see the Bio-Dag. Destro then shows Baroness footage of the Joes in his castle. Destro then speaks over the speakers as he activates the Battle Android Troopers and proposes a partnership to Baroness. When the Joes get too close to the Bio-Dag, Destro unleashes the Iron Grenadier armors and more B.A.T.s on them. As Duke ends up hijacking Baroness' chopper, Destro has his troops fire on Baroness' chopper while telling her that he will buy her a new chopper. Destro then has his troops hold their fire and have the other Joes imprisoned in the dungeon. Cobra Commander then contacts them and states that the Bio-Dag should be launched into a mining town in Greenland to take care of Cobra Industries' competition. Destro and Baroness interrogate the Joes and Scarlett tells him that the Techno-Viper was heading to Scotland. Destro suspects that Doctor Mindbender probably programmed the Techno-Viper to dispose of Destro as both of them leave to watch the Bio-Dag's launch. The Joes end up attacking the launch site causing a malfunction that would cause the Bio-Dag to fill the castle with fire. Duke then attacks Destro as he succeeds in freeing the Bio-Dag. Duke manages to destroy the Bio-Dag. Destro manages to carrying a weakened Baroness away as the castle ends up exploding. Destro tells Baroness that he will take full responsibility on what the Joes did to the Bio-Dag.

In "Cutting Edge", Destro secretly hires a high-tech Jinx in order to take out Cobra Commander as part of his revenge. Cobra Commander orders Destro to send every B.A.T. to Cobra Towers to take out Jinx.

In "Revelations" Pt. 2, Destro attacks the Joes in a prototype H.I.S.S. Tank when they infiltrate Cobra Commander's stronghold. The Joes managed to defeat him and the H.I.S.S. Tank by throwing missiles on it causing it to crash. It is unknown if Destro survived or not.

Live action film

G.I. Joe: The Rise of Cobra
Destro appears as the main antagonist of the live action film G.I. Joe: The Rise of Cobra, portrayed by Christopher Eccleston. In the movie, James McCullen's family background is retconned as his ancestor James McCullen IX was only punished by the French monarchy in the 17th century after being caught selling weapons to both them and England, condemned to have a red-hot iron mask welded onto his face and serve as an example to others who attempted to overthrow the crown. He also reveals that James McCullen I was also called Destro, explaining it to be short for the "Destroyer of Nations" which his family has been known for because of their shady arms-dealing.

Supplying the world's governments through M.A.R.S. (here known as Military Armaments Research Syndicate), James McCullen is secretly a terrorist mastermind, using NATO's funding for his research on nanomites before arranging for it to be stolen by M.A.R.S. agents, using one of the warheads to attack Paris as retribution for his ancestor's punishment. McCullen is also planning to rule the world. He is the primary antagonist for most of the movie, but by the end of the film, McCullen is severely burned as Rex Lewis takes control of the organization, with the familiar Cobra logo on the side of his personal sub. "Cobra Commander" then uses more of the stolen Nanomites to reconstruct McCullen's face, transforming his skin into living metal. Suffering the same fate as his ancestor and forced, by the nanonites' mind controlling ability, to be obedient to Cobra Commander, McCullen is dubbed "Destro" before being arrested and placed in a high security prison.

G.I. Joe: Retaliation
Destro appears in the sequel, having been transferred with Cobra Commander from the USS Flagg to a high-security German prison and put into stasis. When Storm Shadow and Firefly break Cobra Commander out of prison, Cobra Commander decides to leave Destro imprisoned, joking "you're out of the band". He is implied to have died, as the prison is destroyed soon after.

Video games
Destro is one of the featured villains in the 1985 G.I. Joe: A Real American Hero computer game.

Destro appeared as a boss in the 1991 G.I. Joe video game and in 1992's G.I. Joe: The Atlantis Factor for the Nintendo Entertainment System. In the first NES game, he is wearing his Iron Grenadier uniform, and pilots The Despoiler air vehicle. He is also the second-to-last boss in Konami's G.I. Joe arcade game.

In the video game G.I. Joe: The Rise of Cobra, he is the third boss, who is fought towards the end of the "Jungle Fuel" act.

References

External links
 Destro at JMM's G.I. Joe Comics Home Page
 Destro at The Inner Sanctum fansite

Action film villains
Action Force characters
Cobra (G.I. Joe) agents
Comics characters introduced in 1983
Fictional businesspeople
Fictional commanders
Fictional henchmen
Fictional lairds
Fictional private military members
Fictional Scottish people
Male characters in animated series
Male film villains
Television characters introduced in 1983
Video game bosses
Villains in animated television series